A fly-killing device is used for pest control of flying insects, such as houseflies, wasps, moths, gnats, and mosquitoes.

Flyswatter

The venting or perforations minimize the disruption of air currents, which can be detected by the fly and allow it to escape, and also reduce air resistance, making it easier to hit a fast-moving target such as a fly.

A flyswatter is ideally lightweight and stiff, allowing quick acceleration to overcome the fast reaction time of the fly (six to ten times faster than a human), while also minimizing damage caused by hitting other objects.  The flyswatter usually works by mechanically crushing the fly against a hard surface, after the user has waited for the fly to land somewhere.  However, some skilled users can injure or stun an airborne insect in mid-flight by whipping the swatter through the air at an extreme speed.

History
The abeyance of insects by use of short horsetail staffs and fans is an ancient practice, dating back to the Egyptian pharaohs [Correction Needed]. The earliest flyswatters were in fact nothing more than some sort of striking surface attached to the end of a long stick. An early patent on a commercial flyswatter was issued in 1900 to Robert R. Montgomery who called it a fly-killer.
 Montgomery sold his patent to John L. Bennett, a wealthy inventor and industrialist who made further improvements on the design.

However, the origin of the name "flyswatter" does not come from its inventors. In the summer of 1905, Kansas was plagued by an overabundance of flies, which as well as causing annoyance, aided in the spread of communicable disease. Dr. Samuel Crumbine, a member of the Kansas board of health, wanted to raise public awareness of the threat of flies. He was inspired by a chant at a local Topeka softball game: "swat the ball". In a health bulletin published soon afterwards, he exhorted Kansans to "swat the fly". In response, a schoolteacher named Frank H. Rose created the "fly bat", a device consisting of a yardstick attached to a piece of screen. Crumbine had named the device now commonly known as the flyswatter.

Fly gun

The fly gun (or flygun), a derivative of the flyswatter, uses a spring-loaded plastic projectile to mechanically "swat" flies. Mounted on the projectile is a perforated circular disk, which, according to advertising copy, "won't splat the fly". Several similar products are sold, mostly as toys or novelty items, although some maintain their use as traditional fly swatters.

Another gun-like design consists of a pair of mesh sheets spring loaded to "clap" together when a trigger is pulled, squashing the fly between them. In contrast to the traditional flyswatter, such a design can only be used on an insect in mid-air.

Another projectile fly killer is the Bug-a-Salt, a miniaturized shotgun that shoots a spray of dry table salt using a spring-compressed air blast similar to a BB rifle. The pneumatic salt-shot approach is claimed to be effective, because the high speed, small-sized salt grains are apparently undetected by the targeted fly until it is too late to dodge them.

Fly bottle

A fly bottle or glass flytrap is a passive trap for flying insects. In the Far East, it is a large bottle of clear glass with a black metal top with a hole in the middle. An odorous bait is placed in the bottom of the bottle in the form of pieces of meat. Flies enter the bottle in search of food and are then unable to escape because their phototaxis behavior leads them anywhere in the bottle except to the darker top where the entry hole is.

In use, the bottle is stood on a plate and some sugar is sprinkled on said plate to attract flies, whom eventually fly up into the bottle, whose trough is filled with beer or vinegar, into which the flies fall and drown. In the past, the trough was sometimes filled with a dangerous mixture of milk, water, and arsenic or mercury chloride.

Variants of these bottles are the agricultural fly traps used to fight the Mediterranean fruit fly and the olive fly, which have been in use since the 1930s. They are smaller, without feet, and the glass is thicker for rough outdoor usage, often involving suspension in a tree or bush. Modern versions of this device are often made of plastic, and can be purchased in some hardware stores. They can also be improvised from disposable plastic drink bottles.

Disposable fly traps
Disposable fly traps are small “use and throw away” fly traps. The traps are disposable plastic bags containing some attractant, generally made of flavoring agents that are non-toxic. Water and direct sunlight are used to activate the attractant, which emits a smell to lure the flies. Insects enter the trap and drown in the water inside.

Glue board
A glue board is a capture device with a strong adhesive. A small card covered in sticky adhesive is situated in an enclosure so that when the flies come into contact with it, they stick to it and die. A reusable glue board may be renewed through the use of vegetable oil, and then the removal of the oil with dishwashing detergent and a rinse of water.  Alternatively, the card is disposed of and completely replaced periodically.

Flypaper

Flypaper (also known as fly paper, fly sticker, fly strip, fly ribbon, or fly tape) attracts flies to adhesive so that they can be trapped. The exposed adhesive strip makes it more stick-prone than an enclosed glue board.  To avoid accidental entanglement with humans, the strips are often hung in relatively inaccessible spaces, such as near ceilings.  One type of fly strip is packaged in a small cardboard tube with a pin on the top. It is used by pulling the pin off the top (usually covered with wax), removing the adhesive "fly strip" and using the pin to attach it to a ceiling, with the tube dangling below as a small weight.  Flypaper is not reused, but is replaced when it loses effectiveness.

Flypaper is often impregnated with a slightly odorous chemical to attract more flies. The attractiveness of flypaper to other insects (such as mosquitoes and biting midges) is sometimes enhanced by shining a small portable electric light on the sticky surface.

Bug vacuum
A bug vacuum (bug vac or aspirator) is a type of small but powerful portable vacuum cleaner, usually with internal batteries.  The motor starts quickly and generates strong suction, trapping the flying insect inside the device.  The insect may be captured on an adhesive internal surface, or simply held inside the device until it dehydrates and dies.

Some bug vacuums feature non-lethal designs which keep trapped insects inside, but do not otherwise harm them, allowing their later release.  These devices are popular with amateur and professional entomologists, and with persons who wish to avoid the killing of insects.

A related device powered by mouth suction is called a pooter, and is used by entomologists and students to capture small organisms for study.

Fan-based trap
This design uses a continuously-running electric fan to suck in flying insects (especially mosquitos and gnats, which are weak fliers), which are then trapped by a fine mesh grid or bag.  Unable to escape the constant airflow, the insects quickly dehydrate and die.  Some variant designs use carbon dioxide, ultraviolet light, or chemical scent to attract insects to the trap.  Other designs rely on the natural carbon dioxide or scents emitted by people, pets, or livestock to attract pests, and simply collect flying insects as they wander close enough to be sucked in. In addition, the continuous breeze produced by a common electric fan has been found to discourage mosquitos from landing and biting, even without trapping or killing the insects.

Bug zapper

A  bug zapper electric grid (fly zapper) kills insects by electrocution from high voltage on adjacent metallic grids. Bug zappers are generally small appliances intended for use in a fixed location, as distinguished from hand held electric flyswatters.

Electric flyswatter

An electric flyswatter (sometimes called mosquito bat, racket zapper, or zap racket) is a battery-powered, handheld bug zapper that resembles a tennis racket, of which became popular worldwide in the late 1990's. US Patent 5,519,963 was awarded to Taiwanese inventor Tsao-i Shih in 1996 for such a device. The handle contains a battery-powered high-voltage generator. The circuit is a minimalist self-oscillating voltage booster, that is small, low-cost, composed of very few components, and continuing to operate when the battery is depleted to a fraction of its original voltage, a so-called Joule thief circuit.

The flyswatter generates a voltage of between 500 and 3,000 volts (V) when a button switch is held down; the voltage is applied between two grid or mesh electrodes. When the body of a fly bridges the gap between the electrodes, a current passes through the fly. A capacitor attached to the electrodes discharges during the spark, and this initial discharge usually stuns or kills the fly. If the button is kept depressed, the continuous current will rapidly kill and incinerate a small fly. In some swatters an inner mesh is sandwiched between and at a high voltage relative to two outer arrays of rods, designed so that fingers are not able to poke through and bridge the electrodes, while small insects can. Other swatters have an array of rods, with voltage between any rod and its neighbour. The sandwiched mesh and array of rods are illustrated to the right.

Most electric flyswatters conform to electrical safety standards for humans:
 A limit on the charge stored in the capacitor: A discharge of less than 45 microcoulombs (µC) is considered safe, even in the unlikely scenario that the current from a flyswatter would be flowing from one arm to the other arm, partly through the heart. The capacitor of a 1000 V flyswatter, for example, should be less than 45 nanofarads (nF). Due to this precaution for humans, the initial shock is usually inadequate to kill larger insects, but will stun them for long enough that they can be disposed of.
 A limit on the current after the initial discharge: The maximal continuous current of most flyswatters is less than 5 milliamperes (mA). This current is safe, even when flowing from one arm to the other arm of a human.

An advantage over conventional flyswatters is that the electrical models do not have to crush the fly against a surface to kill it, avoiding the smeared mess this can create. Electric swatters kill insects when airborne, not resting on a surface. Insects on a surface will start flying as the swatter approaches, so it can strike them.

See also

 Bug-a-Salt
 Fly-whisk
 Mosquito control
 Venus flytrap
 Sundew plant
 Pitcher plant
 Carnivorous plant
 Mosquito Killer

References

Mechanical hand tools
Insect control
Pest trapping
Flies and humans

es:Matamoscas